Mica fish are lenticular, elongate lozenge, parallelogram-shaped, or lens-shaped (roughly fish-shaped) single mica crystals that are often used as shear sense indicators. They commonly occur in micaceous quartzitic mylonites. They characteristically lie with their longest dimension at a small angle to the mylonitic foliation.

References

Metamorphic petrology
Structural geology